The 4th constituency of Baranya County is one of the single member constituencies of the National Assembly, the national legislature of Hungary. The constituency standard abbreviation: Baranya 04. OEVK.

Since 2018, it has been represented by Csaba Nagy of the Fidesz–KDNP party alliance.

Geography
The 4th constituency is located in western part of Baranya County.

List of municipalities
The constituency includes the following municipalities:

Members
The constituency was first represented by Zsolt Tiffán of the Fidesz from 2014 to 2018. Csaba Nagy of the Fidesz was elected in 2018 and he was re-elected in 2022.

References

Baranya 4th